Nirmala Devi (born 26 June 1984) is an Indian freestyle wrestler. She won a silver medal in the women's freestyle 48 kg event at the 2010 Commonwealth Games.

She was born to Ishwar Singh and Kitabo Devi. Nirmala is the eldest of Ishwar Singh's five children. Poonam, the youngest, is also a wrestler. Nirmala took up wrestling seriously in 2001 and then went on to win the national championship in the same year.

She hails from Hisar district in Haryana and works for Haryana Police. She became a sub-inspector in 2007 after receiving a gold medal at the 2007 Commonwealth Championship in Canada. She also won a gold medal in international wrestling in Spain in 2010.

References

1984 births
Living people
21st-century Indian people
21st-century Indian women
Asian Games competitors for India
Asian Wrestling Championships medalists
Commonwealth Games medallists in wrestling
Commonwealth Games silver medallists for India
Female sport wrestlers from Haryana
Indian female sport wrestlers
People from Hisar district
Sportswomen from Haryana
Wrestlers at the 2010 Asian Games
Wrestlers at the 2010 Commonwealth Games
Medallists at the 2010 Commonwealth Games